Greg Perkins is a former professional tennis player from Australia.

Biography
Perkins is originally from Brisbane but moved to Sydney at the beginning of his career.

As a junior he partnered with Allan McDonald to win the boys' doubles title at the 1970 Australian Open.

In the early 1970s he competed in the professional tour. He was a quarter-finalist in the men's doubles at the 1972 Australian Open partnering Bob Giltinan and made the third round of the singles at the 1973 Wimbledon Championships.

References

External links
 
 

Living people
Australian male tennis players
Year of birth missing (living people)
Australian Open (tennis) junior champions
Tennis people from Queensland
Grand Slam (tennis) champions in boys' doubles